Shun Cutlery is a kitchen knife brand of the KAI Group, headquartered in Tokyo, Japan. In the United States, Shun is sold by Kai USA in Tualatin, Oregon—alongside the Kershaw Knives and Zero Tolerance Knives brands.

History
The origins of the Kai Group date back to 1908, when founder Saijiro Endo established the company in Seki City, Japan. The company produced various cutlery throughout the 20th century, including folding knives, razors, and kitchen cutlery. In 2002, Kai introduced the Shun Cutlery brand to the Western market. All Shun knives are currently made in Seki City and are distributed to over 30 countries.

Awards

Shun has been recognized at the annual Blade Show in Atlanta, Georgia. Additionally, International Forum Design presented the Shun/Ken Onion Chef's Knife with an iF Product Design Award in 2005.

Products

Shun Cutlery produces several lines of kitchen knives in Seki City, Japan.

Shun Series

 Classic
 Classic Pro
 Dual Core
 Fuji
 Hikari
 Hiro
 Kaji
 Kanso
 Premier
 Shun Blue
 Sora

Appearances in media

A Shun Hollow-Ground Slicing Knife appeared in season 3 of Hannibal. A Classic Bird's Beak knife also made an appearance on True Detective.

A set of Shun Premier cutlery was seen on the season 4 finale of The Blacklist. Outdoorsman Steven Rinella also used a Premier Chef's Knife on season 5 of MeatEater.

Mystery writer Jeffery Deaver included a Shun Premier Slicing Knife in the crime novel The Kill Room.

A virtual Shun knife is an award in the mobile game Family Guy: The Quest for Stuff.

References

External links
 
 Shun Knives Review

2002 establishments in Oregon
Companies based in Tualatin, Oregon
Knife manufacturing companies
Manufacturing companies established in 2002
Japanese brands